Fauzi Toldo (born 22 November 1981) is an Indonesian professional footballer who currently plays as a goalkeeper for Sriwijaya F.C. in the Indonesia Super League.

Career

Sriwijaya F.C.
He moved from Putra Samarinda to Sriwijaya on 17 October 2013.

References

External links
 
 Player profil at goal.com

1981 births
Living people
Indonesian footballers
Liga 1 (Indonesia) players
Sriwijaya F.C. players
Persiba Bantul players
Persik Kediri players
Persisam Putra Samarinda players
PSM Makassar players
Association football goalkeepers